Ffion Davies (born 18 January 1995) is a Welsh submission grappler, mixed martial artist and a world-champion Brazilian Jiu Jitsu (BJJ) competitor. A member of Wales Judo National team when she was a junior, Davies holds a black belt in both BJJ and judo.

Davies is the first British/Welsh black belt world champion (in both Gi and No-Gi), the first European to win the Brazilian Nationals, the lightest ever grappler to win the IBJJF European absolute division and the first British/Welsh ADCC Submission Fighting World Champion.

Early life 
Ffion Eira Davies was born on 18 January 1995 in Swansea, Wales. She started playing rugby then switched to judo at the age of 8 starting competing extensively, Davies became a Welsh and British Open judo champion in the junior division and was selected into the Welsh National Judo team.

Career

Early career 
After leaving judo during her teenage years Davies started MMA in 2013 alongside Brett Johns, Davies won her first four MMA fights by first round submission, then decided to focus on learning Brazilian jiu-jitsu; she trained under Chris Rees, the first Welsh black belt in jiu-jitsu, receiving her blue belt from him at his Academy in Swansea.
In 2015, competing under Gracie Barra as a blue belt, she won her first European Championship in the Lightweight division. After attending seminars of black belt Darragh O’Conail, Davies moved to Dublin, to start training at East Coast Jiu-Jitsu. On 27 November 2018 O’Conaill promoted her to black belt.

Black belt career

2018–2019: IBJJF World No-Gi Champion, European Champion, Pan Am Champion 
A month after receiving her belt, Davies won double gold at the Dublin International Open (Feather and Open Class) followed by gold at the World No-Gi Championship becoming the first black belt from the UK to win that tournament. At the start of 2019 she won the European Championship, the Polaris Grappling Invitational, the Abu Dhabi Grand Slam London, and then became Pan American Champion after winning Gold in California. A month later, Davies won the Brazilian National Jiu-Jitsu Championship (known as Brasileiros) becoming the first European to win, and then winning Bronze at the 2019 World Jiu-Jitsu Championship (known as Mundials).

At the 2019 ADCC Submission Fighting World Championship, she won Silver after submitting the tournament's favourite Bia Mesquita in the semi-final, in what has been called "one of the most shocking upsets in jiu-jitsu history" she was invited to compete at the 2022 ADCC World Championship as a result. She returned to the UK to win the British National followed by the Berlin International Open Championship in November.

2020–2021: Third European and second World No-Gi championship titles 
In 2020, Davies won double gold at the European Championship in the Lightweight division and in Open Class, beating the Super-Heavyweight Champion Jessica Flowers, becoming the lightest grappler to win the European absolute division. After returning to the UK she won another Abu Dhabi Grand Slam London. In 2021, she won the World No-Gi championship for the second time in her weight division. At the 2022 Pan Jiu-Jitsu Championship Davies won silver after being defeated by Nathalie Ribeiro in the final, both competitors were praised for their sportsmanship following the match, after congratulating her opponent Davies posted: "We all have the same goal and will likely all have our moment. Don’t dull anyone else’s shine."

2022: IBJJF World Champion, ADCC Submission Fighting World Champion 
In early 2022, Davies started training at Essential Jiu Jitsu (an Atos affiliated academy), under the coaching of JT Torres. In June 2022 Davies won the World Jiu-Jitsu Championship in the Lightweight division, becoming the first Welsh and British black belt jiu-jitsu world champion. At the 2022 ADCC World Championship Davies became the first Welsh and British Submission Fighting world champion after defeating Bia Mesquita 6-0 in the semi-final and Brianna Ste-Marie by a score of 10-0 in the final.

She was then invited to compete in the women's under 66 kg grand prix at Polaris 23 on March 11, 2023. Davies defeated Giovanna Jara in the opening round before being submitted by the eventual champion Elisabeth Clay in the semi-final.

Competitive summary 
Main achievements at black belt level:
 IBJJF World Champion (2022)
 2X IBJJF World No-Gi champion (2018/2021)
 ADCC Submission Fighting World Champion (2022)
 3X IBJJF European Open champion (2019/2020)
 1X CBJJ Brazilian Nationals champion (2019)
 1X Pan American Championship champion (2019)
 2X UAEJJF Grand Slam winner, London (2019 / 2020)
 2nd place ADCC Submission Fighting World Championship (2019)
 2nd place UAEJJF Abu Dhabi World Pro (2019)
 British National IBJJF Jiu-jitsu Champion (2019)
 3rd place AJP Grand Slam LDN (2022)

Main Achievements (Coloured Belts):
 1X IBJJF World champion (2018 brown)
 1X IBJJF World No-Gi champion (2016 purple)
 1X IBJJF European Open champion (2015 blue, 2016 purple)
 2X IBJJF European Open No-Gi champion (2018 brown)
 1X ADCC European Trials champion (2018)
 2nd Place IBJJF World Championship (2016/2017 purple)
 2nd Place UAEJJF Abu Dhabi Pro (2018 brown)
 2nd Place IBJJF European Open (2018 brown)

Instructor lineage 
Royler Gracie → Saulo Ribeiro → (Alexandre Ribeiro) → Darragh O’Conaill → Ffion Davies

Fight history

Personal life 
Ffion Davies is a native Welsh speaker. In a 2020 interview she has stated that she's a vegetarian.

Awards and honours 
 Jitsmagazine BJJ Awards 'Female Grappler of the Year (No Gi)' (2022)
 Jitsmagazine BJJ Awards 'Female Grappler of the Year (Gi & No Gi)' (2020)

Notes

References 

1995 births
Welsh practitioners of Brazilian jiu-jitsu
Living people
Welsh female mixed martial artists
People awarded a black belt in Brazilian jiu-jitsu
Welsh female judoka
Welsh submission wrestlers
Sportspeople from Swansea
British female judoka
World Brazilian Jiu-Jitsu Championship medalists
Brazilian jiu-jitsu world champions (women)
World No-Gi Brazilian Jiu-Jitsu Championship medalists
Female Brazilian jiu-jitsu practitioners
ADCC Submission Fighting World Champions (women)
Brazilian jiu-jitsu practitioners who have competed in MMA (women)
Brazilian jiu-jitsu practitioners who have competed in Judo (women)